The Smith, later Smith-Gordon Baronetcy, is a title in the Baronetage of the United Kingdom. It was created on 19 July 1838 for General Lionel Smith, Governor of Jamaica from 1836 to 1839. The second Baronet assumed by Royal licence the additional surname of Gordon in 1868 as his mother Isabella was the daughter of Eldred Curwen Pottinger and his wife Anne, daughter of Robert Gordon.

Smith, later Smith-Gordon baronets (1838)
Sir Lionel Smith, GCB, GCH, 1st Baronet (1778–1842)
Sir Lionel Eldred Smith-Gordon, 2nd Baronet (1833–1905)
Sir Lionel Eldred Pottinger Smith-Gordon, 3rd Baronet (1857–1933)
Sir Lionel Eldred Pottinger Smith-Gordon, 4th Baronet (1889–1976)
Sir (Lionel) Eldred Peter Smith-Gordon, 5th Baronet (born 1935)

The heir apparent is Lionel George Eldred Smith-Gordon (born 1964), eldest son of the 5th Baronet.

His heir apparent is his eldest son, (Lionel) Henry Yuji Smith-Gordon (born 1998

References
Kidd, Charles, Williamson, David (editors). Debrett's Peerage and Baronetage (1990 edition). New York: St Martin's Press, 1990.

Smith-Gordon